Stylish with Jenna Lyons is an American streaming television reality series that premiered on HBO Max on December 3, 2020.

Premise
Each episode follows American fashion stylist Jenna Lyons and her team of designers as they tackle design projects ranging from home renovations to launching new fashion brands.

Episodes

Development
In October 2018 it was announced that Jenna Lyons had signed a deal with WarnerMedia to develop an unscripted series about her life after resigning as president of J. Crew in 2017. In May 2019, it was announced that the series would be released as The Jenna Lyons Project and premiere on TNT. A teaser for the series was released in September 2020, where it was announced the show would be titled Stylish with Jenna Lyons and premiered exclusively on HBO Max on December 3, 2020.

References

External links
 Stylish with Jenna Lyons on HBO Max
 
 Fashion House

HBO Max original programming
2020s American reality television series
2020 American television series debuts
2020 American television series endings
Fashion-themed reality television series
Reality web series